The Grambling State Tigers are the college football team representing the Grambling State University. The Tigers play in NCAA Division I Football Championship Subdivision (FCS) as a member of the Southwestern Athletic Conference.

The prominence of Grambling football is longstanding. The Tigers, under Hall of Fame coach Eddie Robinson, who guided them to 408 victories in 55 seasons from 1941 to 1942 and 1945 to 1997, were built as a small-school powerhouse with more than 200 players who played professional football.

On September 24, 1976, Grambling State and Morgan State became the first collegiate football teams from the United States to play a game in the continent of Asia.  GSU defeated Morgan State 42–16 in Tokyo, Japan.  In fall 1977, the GSU Tigers were invited back to Tokyo where they defeated Temple University 35–32 in the inaugural Mirage Bowl game.

Among its accomplishments include: 15 Black college football national championships (tied for second most in HBCU history) and 26 Conference Championships (1 Midwest Conference & 25 SWAC).  The Tigers have won the most SWAC Championships to date.

Football classifications
1937–1952: NA
1953–1972: NCAA College Division (Small College)
1973–1976: NCAA Division II
1977: NCAA Division I
1978–present: NCAA Division I-AA (FCS)

Conference affiliations
1928–1951: Independent
1952–1957: Midwestern Conference
1958–present: Southwestern Athletic Conference

Annual Classics
State Fair Classic
Red River State Fair Classic
Bayou Classic

Championships

Notes: an asterisk denotes co-championships; a double-asterisk denotes forfeits

Midwestern Conference Championships
1955

SWAC Championships

1960 (shared with Prairie View A&M and Southern)
1965
1966 (shared with Arkansas-Pine Bluff, Southern, and Texas Southern)
1967
1968 (shared with Alcorn State and Texas Southern)
1971
1972 (shared with Jackson State)
1973 (shared with Jackson State)
1974 (shared with Alcorn State)
1975 (shared with Jackson State and Southern; vacated due to violation of SWAC rules for scheduling opponents)
1977
1978
1979 (shared with Alcorn State)
1980 (shared with Jackson State)
1983
1985 (shared with Jackson State)
1989
1994 (shared with Alcorn State)
2000
2001
2002
2005
2008
2011
2016
2017

Black college football national championships
1955
1967 (shared with Morgan State)
1972
1974 (shared with Alcorn State)
1975 (shared with Southern)
1977 (shared with Florida A&M and South Carolina State)
1980
1983 (shared with Central State and Tennessee State)
1992 (shared with Central State)
2000
2001 (shared with Florida A&M and Tuskegee)
2002 (shared with Bethune–Cookman)
2005 (shared with Hampton)
2008 (shared with South Carolina State)
2016

Division I-AA/FCS Playoffs results
The Tigers have appeared in the I-AA/FCS playoffs three times with a record of 0–3.

Division II Playoffs results
The Tigers have appeared in the Division II playoffs one time with an overall record of 1–1.

College Football Hall of Fame members
Buck Buchanan - OT, 1959–1962, inducted 1996
Gary "Big Hands" Johnson - DT, 1971–1974, inducted 1997
Eddie Robinson - Coach, 1941–1997, inducted 1997 (third most victories in college football history)
Doug Williams - QB, 1974–1977, inducted 2001
Paul "Tank" Younger - FB, 1945–1948, inducted 2000

Pro Football Hall of Fame members
Over 100 Grambling State alumni have played in the NFL, including four Pro Football Hall of Famers:
 Willie Brown, inducted 1984
 Buck Buchanan, inducted 1990
 Willie Davis, inducted 1981
 Charlie Joiner, inducted 1996

See also
 List of Grambling State Tigers in the NFL Draft
 List of NCAA Division I FCS football programs
 Grambling State Tigers
Season of the Tiger
Grambling's White Tiger

References

External links
 

 
American football teams established in 1928
1928 establishments in Louisiana